Provincial road N812 is a Dutch provincial road.

See also

References

External links

812
812